Chandler Owen (April 5, 1889 – November 2, 1967) was an African-American writer, editor and early member of the Socialist Party of America.  Born in North Carolina, he studied and worked in New York City, then moved to Chicago for much of his career.  He established his own public relations company in Chicago and wrote speeches for candidates and presidents including Thomas Dewey, Dwight D. Eisenhower, and Lyndon B. Johnson.

Biography
Owen was born in Warrenton, North Carolina, in 1889. He graduated from Virginia Union University in 1913. Later, while studying economics at Columbia University in 1916, he joined the Socialist Party of America. He began a lifelong friendship with A. Philip Randolph and together they followed the lead of radical activist Hubert Harrison. They soon became known in Harlem as "Lenin" (Owen) and "Trotsky" (Randolph). The two started a journal in 1917, called The Messenger, which published leading literary and political writers. Soon after, while Owen was running for the New York State Assembly, he and Randolph were jailed, where they were mocked and treated cruelly for their Socialist affiliations.

Owen moved to Chicago, Illinois, shortly thereafter and found himself quickly enlightened with socialistic views. He became managing editor of the Chicago Bee, a major African-American publication, and continued to back Randolph in his efforts to unionize Pullman porters on the railroads. With his mounting career success, Owen went on to establish his own public relations company.  He remained interested in politics and wrote many speeches for politicians such as Wendell Willkie, Thomas Dewey, and even for US presidents Dwight Eisenhower and Lyndon B. Johnson.

In the 1920s, Owen became a Republican. He would later run unsuccessfully for a seat in the United States House of Representatives. For the remainder of his life, he worked in public relations and continue to write speeches.

Suffering from terminal kidney disease, Owen wrote a last letter to Philip Randolph saying, ..."Our long friendship, never soiled, is nearing its close. I've been in pain. If you were not living, I would commit suicide today." Owen died soon after in November 1967.

Like Harrison, Owen was an atheist. In a 1919 issue of The Messenger he and Randolph wrote, "We don't thank God for anything... our Deity is the toiling masses of the world and the things for which we thank are their achievement."

Electoral history

References

Banks, W. M. Black Intellectuals: Race and Responsibility in American Life, New York: W. W. Norton & Company, 1996.

External links
African American History Vignette: Chandler Owen (1889-1967).

1889 births
1967 deaths
People from Warrenton, North Carolina
African-American people in Illinois politics
Columbia University alumni
Members of the Socialist Party of America
Illinois Republicans
African-American writers
American writers
20th-century African-American people